Guess Who's Coming to Lunch may refer to:

 "Guess Who's Coming to Lunch", an episode of the Canadian animated television series Almost Naked Animals
 "Guess Who's Coming to Lunch", an episode of the British television sitcom My Hero
 "Guess Who's Coming to Lunch", an episode of the British television sitcom A Class by Himself

Guess Who's Coming to Luncheon may refer to:

 "Guess Who's Coming to Luncheon", an episode of the television reality series The Girls Next Door
 "Guess Who's Coming to Luncheon", an episode of the television sitcom Murphy Brown

See also 
 Guess Who's Coming to Dinner (disambiguation)
 Guess Who's Coming to Breakfast (disambiguation)
 "Guess Who's Not Coming to Lunch?", an episode of the television sitcom Grace Under Fire